Sassacus cyaneus is a species of jumping spider. It used to be the only described species of the genus Agassa, but was transferred to the genus Sassacus in 2008. It seems to be closely related to S. papenhoei, but differs in the form of the carapace.

S. cyaneus is native to Sonora in Mexico, and parts of the United States.

Footnotes

References
 Richman, David B. (2008): Revision of the jumping spider genus Sassacus (Araneae, Salticidae, Dendryphantinae) in North America. Journal of Arachnology 36(1): 26-48.  Full Article
 Platnick, Norman I. (2008): The world spider catalog, version 9.0. American Museum of Natural History.

External links
 Salticidae.org: Diagnostic drawings

Salticidae
Spiders of Mexico
Spiders of the United States
Spiders described in 1846
Taxa named by Nicholas Marcellus Hentz